Valentini is a surname and, less commonly, a given name, of Italian origin. It is etymologically related to the name, Valentine. People with the name include:

People with the surname
 Valentini, an aristocratic family, at one time owners of Canossa Castle
 Andrea Valentini (designer) (born 1961), American designer
 Andrea Valentini (pentathlete) (born 1977), Italian modern pentathlete
 Andrea Valentini, drummer for Blood, Sweat & Tears since 2001
 Antonio Valentini, president of Central Bank of San Marino
 Antony Valentini, theoretical physicist
 Carlo Valentini (born 1982), San Marinese footballer
 Federico Valentini (born 1982), San Marinese footballer
 Frank Valentini (born 1963), American television producer, executive producer for the ABC soap opera One Life to Live, currently General Hospital
 Gian Domenico Valentini (1639–1715), Italian still life painter
 Giovanni Valentini (c. 1582–1649), Italian baroque composer, teacher of Johann Kaspar Kerll
 Giovanni Valentini (classical era composer) (c. 1730–1804), Italian classical composer, poet and painter.
 Giovanni Valentini (pianist), Italian pianist, teacher of Gianluca Luisi
 Giuseppe Valentini (albanologist) (1900–1979), Italian albanologist
 Giuseppe Valentini (1681–1753), Italian violinist, painter, poet, and composer
 Pier Francesco Valentini (1570-1654), Italian music theorist
 Jean-Pierre Valentini, Trafigura executive, see 2006 Ivory Coast toxic waste dump
 Lucia Valentini Terrani (1946–1998), Italian operatic mezzo-soprano
 Mariella Valentini (born 1959), Italian actress
 Roberto Valentini (c. 1671–1747), Anglo-Italian composer also known as Robert Valentine

Fictional
 Flip Valentini, character in the Baseball Card Adventures series of novels by Dan Gutman
 Harry Valentini, protagonist of Wise Guys
 Stefano Valentini, primary antagonist in the first half of The Evil Within 2

People with the given name
 Valentini Daskaloudi, (born 1979), Greek female fashion model
 Valentini Grammatikopoulou (born 1997), Greek woman tennis player
 Valentino Urbani (fl. 1690–1722), Italian male castrato opera singer nicknamed "Valentini"

See also
Valentini (disambiguation)

References